Jeanne Champion (born 25 June 1931, near Lons-le-Saunier) is a French painter and historical novelist.

Biography 
Jeanne Champion, born in a peasant environment, is largely self-taught. An artist-painter since 1956, she has produced many works in her two fields of activity. In painting, often unsatisfied, she destroyed many of her creations but she left some 200 paintings and a good number of engravings.

Honours 
A writer since 1961, Champion was awarded the Prix Goncourt de la biographie in 1984 for her fictionalized biography of Suzanne Valadon, translated into several languages.

She was also given the Grand Prix du roman de la Société des gens de lettres (1980) for her novel Les frères Montaurian, the Prix de l'Événement du jeudi (1986) for le Bunker and the Prix des écrivains croyants (1990) for her documentary book Mémoires en exil.

In 1982, she was awarded the Prix Alice-Louis Bartoux of the Académie française.

She was elevated to the rank of officier of the Ordre des Arts et des Lettres in 2001.

Works

Literature 
 1967: Le Cri, novel, Éditions Julliard. 
 1968: Les Miroirs jumeaux, novel, Julliard.
 1969: X., novel, Bourgois.
 1969: Les Enfants des Roumis, éd. d'Halluin et Cie
 1973: Vautour-en-Privilège, novel, ed. Calmann-Lévy
 1974: Ma Fille Marie-Hélène Charles Quint, ed. Calmann-Lévy 
 1975: Dans les jardins d'Esther, novel, ed. Calmann-Lévy
 1977: Les Gisants ed. Calmann-Lévy
 1979: Les frères Montaurian, novel, Éditions Grasset
 1981: La Passion selon Martial Montaurian, novel, éd. Grasset
 1982: L'Amour capital, novel, Calmann-Lévy
 1984: Suzanne Valadon, fictionalized biography, 
 1985: Le Bunker, Calmann-Lévy
 1986: Bette Davis, Lherminier. 
 1987: La Hurlevent, fictionalized biography, Presses de la Renaissance. 
 1989: Memoires en exil, documentary, Fayard.
 1996: La Maison Germanicus, Grasset.
 1999: L'Amour à perpétuité, novel, Grasset.
 2001: Lambeaux de mémoire : Enfance, éd. Plon
 2002: J'hallucine, éd. Mille et une nuits.
 2004: Autoportrait d'une charogne: Lambeaux de mémoire II, éd. Plon 
 2005: Le terrible, fictionalized biography of Ivan the Terrible, éd. Fayard
 2006: Le Fils du silence, éd. Fayard. 
 2007: Ils ne savent plus dire "Je t'aime", éd. Fayard
 2008: L'ombre de Judas, éd. Fayard
 2009: Là où tu n'es plus, novel, éd. Fayard
 2011: Le prince de la mélancolie, novel Charles d'Orléans, éd. Pierre-Guillaume de Roux Éditions

Painting 
2002: Idoles, suivi de Avant-dernière toiles (with Yann Queffélec), Cercle d'Art.

Bibliography 
 Alain Bosquet, Les envoûtements de Jeanne Champion
 Sarah Charlotte Rouncefield, Theme and Form in the Works of Jeanne Champion, University of Exeter, 1994

References

External links 
 Site de l'artiste
 Jeanne Champion on the site of the Académie française
 Biography

20th-century French writers
21st-century French writers
French historical novelists
French biographers
Officiers of the Ordre des Arts et des Lettres
Prix Goncourt de la Biographie winners
People from Lons-le-Saunier
1931 births
Living people
20th-century French women writers
21st-century French women writers
Women biographers